The Haisla (also known as Xa’islak’ala, X̄a’islakʼala, X̌àʼislakʼala, X̣aʼislak’ala, Xai:sla) are an amalgamation of two bands, the Kitamaat people of upper Douglas Channel and Devastation Channel and the Kitlope People of upper Princess Royal Channel and Gardner Canal in British Columbia, Canada.

The Kitamaat call themselves Haisla ("dwellers downriver"); and the Kitlope Henaaksiala ("dying off slowly"), a reference to their traditional longevity. The word Kitamaat comes from the Tsimshian people, who originate from the Prince Rupert and Metlakatla areas. While Kitamaat means people of the snow in Tsimshian, kit means people and amaat refers to territory or place.

The Haisla are a group indigenous people that have lived at Kitamaat Village as their natural area of residence in the North Coast region of British Columbia, and have occupied these lands, for at least 9,000 years. Today, the they are located in Kitamaat Village, otherwise known as Kitimat Village. Home to about half of the 1700 Haisla, the village sits at the head of the Douglas Channel in British Columbia, while most of the people live elsewhere in the Greater Vancouver region. Their language, Haisla, is named after them in most English usage, though its actual name is X̄a’islak̓ala. The name Haisla is derived from the Haisla word x̣àʼisla or x̣àʼisəla ("those living at the rivermouth, living downriver"). Along with the neighbouring Wuikinuxv and Heiltsuk people, they were incorrectly known in the past as the Northern Kwakiutl.

Naming

The name Kitamaat became misrepresented in 1955 when Alcan Industries entered to build an aluminum smelter in their territory. Attempting to bring a new face to the territory, Alcan called it the "town of the future" and changed the spelling to Kitimat. The Haisla name for Kitamaat Village is Tsee-Motsa (Cʼimaucʼa), meaning Snag Beach.

Location

Kitamaat Village, the Haisla reserve, is a short 20-minute drive south of the town of Kitimat. This town, the site of the aluminum smelter of Alcan Incorporated, is at the head of the Douglas Channel, a  fjord that serves as saltwater corridor connecting the community, the town, and the port of Kitimat to the Pacific Ocean. Kitamaat is a Tsimshian name, applied by European explorers who asked their Tsimshian guides for the name of the place; it means "people of the snows" or "place of the snows". For hundreds of years, the Haisla people have occupied many village sites throughout their territory.

The government of the Haisla people is the Haisla Nation, with its offices in Kitimaat Village.

Ellis Ross was a prominent elected Chief Councillor of the Haisla Nation, and one of the first First Nations leaders in Canada to team up with big oil and liquified natural gas (LNG) companies. He was full-time councillor from 2003 to 2016, and was followed by Crystal Smith, the current Acting Chief.

Haisla clan system
Historically there were six clans within the Haisla people, each named after an animal that had historical significance to the tribe. It is believed that the sixth clan, the Crow, is nearly extinct and has merged with the Raven clan. Each tribe has its own principal chief (Xay’mas), and they would meet whenever needed to discuss issues that would affect the entire tribe. These clan chiefs were very involved in their members' lives, including arranging marriages that would benefit the clan, distributing wealth, and building alliances between clans. The chiefs could take more than one wife, and wives of deceased chiefs could also be inherited by the new chief. The Haisla people were some of the few northern North American indigenous nations that had a tiered class system consisting of noblemen, commoners and slaves. Nobleman had privileges that included participation in secret rituals, and the authority to direct commoners and slaves in labour activities. The nobility was recognized by their piercings: earlobes for the boys, and the lower lip for the girls.  Commoners were free to live as they would but couldn't participate in tribal governance. Slaves were generally war prisoners, were expected to be completely subservient, and could be killed at will.

Clan membership is inherited maternally, with titles and inheritance passing from uncle to nephew instead of the paternal father to son. It is believed that this clan system was inherited from the migration of Tsimshian women as they spread throughout the northern tribes. Each clan has its own unique creation story, in conjunction with the entire tribe's creation story.

Eagle (ai 'ǐksdukuyinihu, from ai 'ĭksdukuyå)
Crests: eagle, sea otter, ermine, owl, shag, hawk, halibut. Sometimes referred to as Owl Clan.  
Clan cry / call: hai hai (imitation of the eagle scream)  
Beaver (gĭtsǎ'k [Tsimshian] kaulu'n [Haisla equivalent])
Crests: beaver, dorsal fin of a dogfish, fireweed, beavers house, human figure holding its knees, k!yEk!a'n (giant beaver), posts or hat rings carved to look like beaver cuttings. Sometimes referred to as the Dogfish Clan.
Clan cry / call: t'am t'am (imitating a beaver hitting its tail on the water)
Raven (giga'k!eni)
Crests: raven, åsEwĕ'lgit (seated human figure with human faces carved or painted onto palms, ears, knees and feet), head and beak of a raven, gosEmdela'h (figure of a man, that when Ravens host a feast, is placed head down in the entrance way. There is human hair added, and as the raven chief enters the feast, the hair will touch him)  
Clan cry / call: Gax gax (Sound of raven croaking)  
Blackfish (Killer Whale / Orca) (hå'låxaini)
Crests: blackfish, dorsal fin or a blackfish, grizzly bear, twilight (red sky of the evening), human figure with another human figure at its breast (walai'gĭtlah), giant deep-sea bear (sa'nis), kelp heads, bu'sbakah (type of sea plant), bŭgwi's and bŭgwå's (Merman and mermaid, resembling humans or monkeys), mountain goat with only one horn, fireweed. Sometimes referred to as Grizzly Bear Clan.   
Clan cry / call: hŏc hŏc (Imitating the blow hole of an orca)

G'psgolox totem pole 

The G'psgolox totem pole is attached with a legend. It is told that, in 1872, a smallpox epidemic infected the people the Haisla Nation (located in the north of what we now call British Columbia), killing the vast majority of inhabitants. The leader of the Eagle Clan of the Haisla tribe, named Chief G'psgolox, lost his whole family due to the epidemic, as well as many of his friends. The legend tells that the bereaved Chief G'spgolox travelled to the forest and attempted to find help there. In the legend, he met with the spirits Tsooda and Zola, who told the Chief to go to the edge of a mountain at dawn, where he would see his deceased loved ones and learn to heal those still living. In the legend, this is how Chief G'psgolox complied and gained vital knowledge, learning the nature of the spirits, the Haisla spirit of continuance and transition. In appreciation of the spirits' help, Chief G'spgolox commissioned a nine-meter-tall totem pole with three figures. The bottom two figures commemorate the deceased and the top figure represents the Tsooda spirit. The pole, while commemorating the dead, told the tale of Haisla survival. It later became known as The G’psgolox Pole.

In 1928 Olof Hanson, the Swedish vice-president to British Columbia, summited a request to the Canadian Department of Indian Affairs to acquire a pole, and in 1929 Olof was granted permission to cut down a totem pole and take it to Sweden. Olof Hanson chose the G'spgolox totem pole and cut it at the base. Olof Hanson took the pole while the Haisla were away due to seasonal living patterns, leaving the Haisla confused and wondering what had happened to the pole. The Norwegian emigrant named Iver Fougner (1870—1947) who chopped down the pole was employed as an Indian agent. He was a contact person between the authorities and Indigenous peoples in the vast district. Olof donated the G’psgolox Pole to the Swedish National Museum of Ethnography that same year. The museum had the pole in storage for many years until they had a proper building to display it in 1980. The pole was on display in this building for 25 years.

When some members of the Haisla Nation heard rumours that the pole may have been up for display in Sweden, it was decided that Louisa Smith and Gerald Amos should travel to Sweden to investigate the rumours. Once they had confirmed that the pole in display was the G’psgolox Pole, the Haisla nation asked for its repatriation. In 1992, a member of the Museum of Ethnography travelled to the Haisla village in British Columbia, where he was told by the Haisla people that the pole was stolen from them and that they had been avidly searching for it without success since the theft in 1929. He was also told that, since the pole was found, it had to be returned to its rightful owners. The Haisla people offered to carve an identical totem replica in exchange for the original. The museum agreed to the proposal by the Haisla people. This led to the Swedish government granting permission for the museum to gift the totem pole to the Haisla people in 1994, with the condition that the replica be an exact match to the original. In 2000, the Haisla community completed two replicas of the pole. One of the replicas were given to Sweden, while the other was placed where the G’psgolox Pole once stood. The poles were carved by Henry Robertson and his sisters sons Derek and Barry Wilson. The Haisla nation also build a historical preservation centre in the Kitimaat Village that would host the original pole.

In 2006, after 77 years at the museum, the pole arrived at the Kitimaat Village in British Columbia. In the shopping mall where it was placed, school children could listen to the elders telling the history of the pole. In 2012, the Kitlope Eagle clan chief decided to move the pole to an old graveyard close to the original location of the pole, where it was left to disintegrate.

Oolichan fishing 
Oolichan is a smelt fish that is so oily that the oil can be made to burn like a candle, hence they are also known as candlefish. For many West Coast Nations, the oolichan has been known as the saviour fish, representing fresh food after a long winter. Oolican grease was one of the most valuable resources to the Haisla, a valuable commodity for trading with other tribes. The process of extracting the fat is to boil the oolichan in large cedar boxes until the grease separates from the meat and rises to the top. The fat is then skimmed off and poured into other containers for storage, to be traded later or eaten throughout the year. Making Oolican oil/grease is very labour-intensive, and would often involve the entire tribe. Women were in charge of making the nets for catching oolichan. Nets were made from harvesting stinging nettles and spinning the fiber into twine. Knitting the intricate nets usually took about three months; when finished, they measured 50 feet long, and 24 feet wide at the mouth, narrowing to 2 feet. When the oolichan nets were made with care, they could last more than 10 years.

Potlatch and feasting 
The potlatch began with the introduction of the mass production of goods within indigenous settlements along the Canadian Pacific coast, mainly British Columbia as well as some parts of the United States such as Oregon and Washington. The potlach word comes from the Chinook jargon that was mainly used for trading purposes in the villages along the Pacific coast of Canada, and it means to “give”. The increases in wealth during this period increased the wealth of many individuals within the indigenous communities. Many individuals that had accumulated large amounts of wealth felt that by giving away their wealth they could gain a higher social status within their community. The potlatch is a ceremony that marks a feast that celebrates a special event such as redress family dishonor, funerals, births and marriage. Indigenous people along the Canadian and US Pacific coast have been practicing these rites for hundreds of years and these ceremonies often last a few days. Historically, the potlatch was a very important social event for the Haisla people. The potlatch served to redistribute goods throughout the tribe. Giving away material wealth at a potlatch was the most significant way of maintaining and improving social standing. These type of ceremonies are an important part of the indigenous culture and is not uncommon for the host indigenous nation of the potlatch to secure a loan so to accommodate for needs and necessities of their guests’ during the festivities. Some of the activities that take place during these ceremonies are: dancing, singing, storytelling and feasting. The purpose of these rituals is to get indigenous nations together, to build stronger social and cultural ties, for this reason, the hosts of the potlach usually give away most or all of their wealth as by doing so boosts their social status within their community and secures a place for them in their cultural social hierarchy. The potlatch requires so much material goods that often clans would need to work together in order to make and gather enough supplies to host a potlatch.

Dances

Dances are normally performed during wintertime at great feasts and potlatches. The Haisla have a series of dances that they perform, which are ranked from the lowest to highest. The lowest dances are usually performed by younger members and commoners, while the higher dances are reserved for nobles and chiefs. Participants in the dance are recognized by the “five vertical streaks on both sides of the face”. The three highest dances are secret, called hai'likula (a word meaning magical or shamanistic) and commoners are not permitted to know the details. Jesters are used to entertain the crowd as dancers would make their preparations behind a screen. They also will dance in select dances. The position of jester is hereditary via the matrilineal line. The preparation for the higher dances is reserved for nobleman and woman, as they are the only members of the tribe that are permitted to witness these preparations. Although noblewomen were not permitted to dance in the higher dances, they were involved in helping with the preparations.  These highest three dances also include the use of whistles and rattles, and the tone of the whistle is distinctive to the dance being performed. Members of the two highest dances are thought to possess magical powers.

Series of Dances, starting with the lowest:

1) Mitla

This dance is usually performed by younger nobles and commoners into advanced years. Most adult nobleman would have long “graduated” from performing this dance, unless he is childless and / or unable to pass on the dance.

2) Glo'ala'ha ("came down a second time")

This dance, like the Mitla, is a common dance.

3) Ula'la

This is the highest of the common dances, and you must be a potential noble to dance. These participants are permitted to witness preparations for the higher dances. The dancers are usually sons of nobleman, who wish to begin preparing them for the higher dances.

4) Nutlåm

The Hisla people believe that this dance originated at Kemano with the (Kitlope) tribe. This is referred to the dog-eater dance, and participants adorn dog skulls when dancing. The number of skulls worn is determined by the number of dogs that the individual has killed and devoured. Historically, the Haisla people believed eating dog meat or human flesh was poisonous. Those who were able to ingest the meat and survive were seen as special.

5) Nu'ntlsista (means dizzy or crazy)

This dance is also referred to as the fire dance. It is considered the second most important dance to the Haisla people. In this dance, the dancers wear their hair matted and act crazy. If anyone in the audience smiles, laughs or speaks they are set upon by the dancers. To demonstrate their might, dancers will walk on hot coals. You must be a nobleman to participate in this dance.

6) Tanish

A Haihais word meaning cannibal or man-eater. The right to participate in the Tanish dance is by inheritance only, with a few exceptions such as a dowry gift. Women are not allowed to dance, but they help with preparations for this dance and act as attendants.

Language

The Haisla language is spoken by the descendants of the Gitamaat and Kitlope bands from the Kitimat area of the northern coast of British Columbia. It is a Northern Wakashan language spoken by several hundred people, and is geographically the northernmost Wakashan language. Its nearest Wakashan neighbour is Oowekyala. Haisla is related to the other North Wakashan languages of Wuikyala, Heiltsuk, and Kwak'wala. It consists of two dialects, sometimes defined as sublanguages: Kitamaat and Kitlope (also known as X̣enaksialak’ala). Haisla names are written in a phonemic alphabet that allows the language's sounds to be distinguished from that of other indigenous people. Several scientific alphabets have been used for writing Haisla, and a transcription system devised by Emmon Bach is used to be able to read the Haisla inscriptions.

In popular culture
 The novel Monkey Beach, by Canadian author Eden Robinson, follows the lives of a Haisla teenager and her family.
Son of a Trickster by Eden Robinson was released in 2017. This novel follows Jared through his grade 10 years in Kitimat and his first encounters with magic. The Canadian television series Trickster based on the novel premiered in 2020.
The Snotty Nose Rez Kids, a Hip Hop duo from the Haisla Nation, won the Juno Award for Indigenous Music Album of the Year in 2019.

Notable people 

 Barry Wilson (born 1952), artist

References

External links

 www.haisla.ca Haisla Nation website

 
 
North Coast of British Columbia